The Green Party of Albania (PGJ), is a political party in Albania that follows the traditions of Green politics and maintains a strong commitment to social progressivism. PGJ is a full member of Global Greens and European Green Party.

History
The Green Party of Albania was created to represent the environmental concerns of Albanians. The importance and urgency of solving numerous environmental problems in Albania prompted a group of young intellectuals from different fields to initiate the beginnings of The Green Party of Albania. Founded on 1 September 2001, as "The Greens of Albania" the official name changed to "Green Party of Albania" on December 15, 2007.

On October 13, 2008, The Green Party of Albania became a full member of the European Green Party. This gives it voting rights in the General Council of the European Green Party.

Under the motto "To protect the environment, vote Greens", the party participated for the first time in 2003 Albanian local elections winning local councillors. This win began Green representation in local decision-making structures. Since that time, the Green Party has regularly participated in local and parliamentary elections. In the 2011 Albanian local elections, the Green Party won 8,448 votes - 20 times more than in previous elections.

Positions
Since its inception, the party has taken several concrete steps to sensitize the Albanian public towards human impact on climate change and the environment. "The Greens" developed a political platform that provides environmentally conscious alternatives to current ways of life. There are now green movements across all 12 districts of the country.

Protests occupy an important place in the political activity of the Greens. Through these protests, the Greens provide a public reaction to environmental degradation and pollution as a means of sensitizing the public to the ongoing issues. In addition to protests, The Green Party has undertaken a series of concrete actions for public awareness, such as seminars, workshops, environmental conferences, distribution of posters, leaflets, territory cleaning activities, and waste reduction. The party's activities have found wide support throughout different segments of the population.

Seats in parliament

Chairmen of PGJ

See also
 Albania
 Green politics

References

External links
Green Party of Albania

Political parties established in 2001
Political parties in Albania
2001 establishments in Albania
European Green Party
Global Greens member parties